Snowy Mountain may refer to:

 Snowy high-latitude mountainous regions.
 Alpine climate, also referred to as a mountain climate or highland climate

 In the United States:
 Snowy Mountain (New York), a mountain in New York.
 Snowy Mountain (Alaska Peninsula, Alaska), a mountain in Alaska

 In Australia:
 Snowy Mountains, a mountain range
 Snowy Mountains scheme, a hydro-power and irrigation scheme

See also
 Big Snowy Mountains, Montana
 Little Snowy Mountains, Montana
 Medicine Bow Mountains, Wyoming